Cignal TV, Inc. (formerly known as GV Broadcasting System), also known by its legal trading name Mediascape Inc., is a Filipino media and telecommunications firm in the Philippines. A wholly owned subsidiary of the media conglomerate MediaQuest Holdings under the PLDT Beneficial Trust Fund, the firm operates its pay television services (Cignal and SatLite), subscription television networks (One News, One Sports+, BuKo Channel, Sari-Sari Channel, NBA TV Philippines, PBA Rush, and UAAP Varsity Channel), television and film entertainment production (Cignal Entertainment), and fiber broadband internet (Red Fiber).

Cignal TV also operates free television channels TV5 (with its main frequencies owned by its sister company of the same name), One Sports (with its main frequency owned by sister network Nation Broadcasting Corporation) and One PH (currently under test broadcast via DWET-TV's digital subchannel 5.2). In addition, under the Mediascape name, it operates UHF 51 via DTT in Manila and a majority of regional TV stations affiliated with TV5 Network, and owns provincial radio stations associated with Apollo Broadcast Investors/GV Radios Network Corporation.

History

Early years
The firm was founded in 1983 as GV Broadcasting System by the Galang family. GV then operated its radio stations in Pampanga and later expanded in Batangas. GV's broadcast franchise was granted in 1995, and was later amended in 1998 allowing the inclusion of establishing its pay-TV business.

In 2007, MediaQuest Holdings acquired a majority stake in GV and its parent Satventures, making the Galangs being part of MediaQuest. The Galangs would spun-off its broadcast radio assets. Smart Communications executive Orlando Vea was then appointed as the new executive of GV.

At that time, it formed a partnership with PLDT subsidiary Smart Communications to launch a mobile TV service called myTV. The trial service was later stopped in 2010.

Expansion and the birth of Cignal TV

In 2008, after its stake in the Sky Cable business was sold to the Lopez Group of Companies, PLDT announced its intention of entering the direct-to-home satellite service industry using the franchise of GV (which in turn, was renamed to Mediascape, Inc.), with the result forming a new DTH satellite brand called Cignal which was launched a year later in 2009.

In 2012, Cignal TV launched its first satellite television networks: lifestyle channel Colours, sports channel Hyper, and Weather Information Network (now defunct). The channels were launched on April 14, 2012.

On March 25, 2015, TV5 Network and Cignal TV announced its partnership with Bloomberg L.P. to establish a local Bloomberg service in the Philippines. It will provide up-to-date business information to aid in their decision-making in an aim to place the country as the "next financial capital of Southeast Asia." The service was formally unveiled on August 13, and it started airing on October 5, 2015.

On August 3, 2015, TV5 Network through its sister company Cignal, ties up with Viva Communications to form an entertainment network the Sari-Sari Channel that will air programs and movies from both the Viva portfolio and TV5. SSN will also handle the production of all the entertainment programs of TV5. Instead of this, the network has appointed Viva head honcho Vic del Rosario, Jr. as its chief entertainment strategist in October 2015.

In 2016, Cignal made a partnership with the Philippine Basketball Association (PBA) to launch PBA Rush, a 24-hour channel featuring content from the PBA as well as live games.

In 2017, Cignal began its new venture outside of the DTH service with the launch of its own entertainment unit Cignal Entertainment.

In 2018, Cignal TV formally launched One News, an English-language news and public affairs channel which features content from the news divisions of the MediaQuest group (News5, The Philippine Star and BusinessWorld).

In 2019, Cignal launched two new channels under the "One" brand, namely: One Sports, a sports channel replacing Hyper; and One PH, an all-Filipino language news and public affairs channel featuring a mix of content from Radyo5 and its own produced programming. In November 2019, Cignal TV made a 5-year content partnership with APT Entertainment for BuKo Channel (Buhay Komedya), the first all-local comedy channel to be launched supposedly in the 2nd quarter of 2020, but was delayed due to the COVID-19 pandemic in the Philippines until the channel would be pushed through on August 2, 2021.

On July 27, 2020, Cignal TV announced the multi-year partnership deal with the NBA, on the announcement it was also mentioned that the provider will launch an NBA-dedicated pay TV channel, NBA TV Philippines along with the airing of games through its free-to-air channels (TV5 and One Sports).

On August 15, 2020, following the resignation of Chot Reyes as TV5 Network president and CEO in June 2019 and the denial of ABS-CBN's franchise by 70 congressmen in July 2020, sister company, TV5 Network announced its partnership with Cignal TV to become as TV5's main content provider to handle the network's blocktime entertainment programming in order to bring back the glory days of TV5 to compete again with GMA Network, TV5's longtime rival and other TV networks in the Philippines, blocktiming with other production companies such as Viva Television, Brightlight Productions and APT Entertainment to air new programs, mostly featuring stars and retrenched creatives from ABS-CBN as well as few stars from GMA.

In October 2020, Cignal TV formally signed a broadcast agreement with the University Athletic Association of the Philippines (UAAP) for the coverage rights of every UAAP varsity sporting events through 2026 on TV5 and One Sports in addition of the upcoming dedicated channel on the Cignal service.

On November 16, 2020, Cignal TV began venturing into the fiber broadband business with the launch of Red Broadband. It is a partnership with Meralco's telco unit Radius Telecoms.

On March 29, 2022, President Rodrigo Duterte signed Republic Act No. 11668 which renewed Cignal TV's legislative franchise for another 25 years. The law granted Cignal TV a franchise to construct, install, operate, and maintain, for commercial purposes, radio broadcasting stations and television stations, including digital television system, with the corresponding facilities such as relay stations, throughout the Philippines.

On August 10, 2022, it was announced that Cignal Cable Corporation (formerly Dakila Cable TV Corporation), Cignal TV's affiliate and corporate partner, would acquire a 38.88% minority stake of ABS-CBN Corporation's cable TV arm, Sky Cable Corporation. Also announced was the investment of ABS-CBN into Cignal's sister company TV5 Network through a "debt instruments agreement". The proposed investment by Cignal Cable will have an option to acquire an additional 61.12% of Sky Cable shares within the next eight years. On September 1, 2022, both parties announced the termination of the proposed investment due to alleged political pressure.

On January 31, 2023, Guido R. Zaballero as president and chief executive officer of TV5 Network, effective February 1, 2023. He will assume the position following the retirement of Robert P. Galang, who headed Cignal TV and TV5 since 2020. Meanwhile, Jane J. Basas has assumed the post of president and CEO of Cignal TV, concurrently with her role as the president and CEO of MediaQuest, the holding company of TV5 and Cignal TV.

Assets

Pay television

Cignal

Cignal is the company's flagship brand operates as a direct-to-home satellite service.

SatLite
SatLite is a digital prepaid pay TV service launched on January 12, 2018. It offers budget-sized lineup of channels with a similarity of Cignal's channel lineup, and is only catered to low income households and rural communities. SatLite uses Koreasat 7, the satellite transponder previously used by the now-defunct Dream Satellite TV prior to the end of 2017.

Television channels
Following the launch of its satellite TV service in 2009, Cignal TV has been establishing its own cable television channels, as well as free-to-air channels.

Free-to-air channels

TV5

TV5 (formerly known as ABC) is the flagship broadcast asset of TV5 Network, where Cignal TV serves as the main content provider. Founded on June 19, 1960, it is branded as the Kapatid (Sibling) Network.

Its programming includes news and information shows from News5, sports programming produced by One Sports, anime, teleserye, soap operas, foreign dramas and cartoons, movie blocks, comedy and gag shows, game shows, as well as informative, talk shows, musicals, reality, and variety shows.

One Sports

One Sports is a free television sports channel owned by Nation Broadcasting Corporation (NBC), where Cignal TV serves as its primary content provider. It was launched on March 8, 2020. One Sports serves as a sports channel for TV5 with its programs primarily produced by its sports division of the same name. It was formerly called 5 Plus, when it was launched on January 13, 2019 and AksyonTV, a Filipino-language news and public affairs channel launched by TV5 in 2011–2019.

One PH

One PH is a 24/7 Filipino-language news/talk and public affairs channel. The channel predominantly airs simulcasts of Radyo5 programs. This channel replaced AksyonTV's "teleradyo" segment when it rebranded as 5 Plus on January 13, 2019. One PH started its official broadcasting on February 18, 2019. Currently, the channel undergoes test broadcast on digital TV in Mega Manila via DWET-TV, and in other key cities in the Philippines.

Pay TV channels

One News

One News is a 24-hour English-language news and public affairs channel in partnership with MVP-owned media properties News5, The Philippine Star, BusinessWorld, Bloomberg TV Philippines and content provider Probe Productions. It was launched on May 28, 2018.

One Sports+

One Sports+ is a sports and entertainment cable/satellite television channel. It was launched on January 9, 2019. This counterpart of One Sports channel was renamed to One Sports+, as terrestrial television channel of One Sports was launched on March 8, 2020, replacing 5 Plus.

Sari-Sari Channel

Sari-Sari Channel is a 24-hour all-Filipino general entertainment channel joint-ventured by TV5 Network, Cignal TV and Viva Entertainment. It airs programs and movies from both the Viva portfolio and TV5 with channel's original productions in partnership with TV5's talents. It was launched on January 15, 2016.

PBA Rush

PBA Rush is a 24/7 channel which has been currently airing games of the Philippine Basketball Association. The channel is patterned after NBA TV and it airs live telecast of the PBA games (in English commentary), same day replays of PBA games, games from the PBA D-League, PBA Women's 3x3 and Batang PBA, Sports 360 and behind-the-scenes shows such as Kuwentong Gilas.

NBA TV Philippines

NBA TV Philippines is a 24/7 channel which has been currently airing games of the National Basketball Association. The channel is the Philippine counterpart of the league-dedicated channel in United States NBA TV and it airs live telecast of the NBA games.

BuKo

BuKo (Buhay Komedya) is an all-comedy channel of Cignal in partnership with APT Entertainment. Its programming primarily focuses on classic local sitcoms and gag shows and as well as original programming.

UAAP Varsity Channel

The UAAP Varsity Channel is a collegiate sports channel in partnership with the UAAP. It airs various collegiate sporting events of the UAAP all-year round, with most of the events primarily on basketball, cheerdance competition, volleyball and football.

Radio

Apollo Broadcast Investors operates/represents the radio assets of GV/Mediascape (thru GV Radios Network Corporation), which its pay-TV congressional franchise is used to operate Cignal and SatLite. GV 99.1, Mediascape's flagship FM station based in Pampanga (operated by GV Radios), is also heard nationwide via Cignal Channel 306.

While it is owned by the same company (MediaQuest Holdings), Apollo Broadcast Investors/GV Radios is not associated with its sister company Nation Broadcasting Corporation, which also operates television and radio stations that are affiliated with TV5 Network.

Cignal Play
Cignal Play is the digital Internet Protocol television (IPTV) and video on demand (VOD) service of Cignal. Exclusively for Cignal and PLDT subscribers, it allows the user to watch live linear channels offered from Cignal as well as content from third-party providers.

In August 2019, it was announced that Cignal will invest P200 million for content production, and is planning to relaunch Cignal Play in October 2019 as a standalone over-the-top (OTT) service with its own original content and shows from third-party productions such as HBO and AXN.

Cignal Play is open to Basic subscribers for free that includes live channels TV5, One Sports, Cignal-exclusive channels (One News, One PH, One Sports+, One Screen and Colours) and other exclusive or free-to-air channels and catch-up episodes from TV5 and Brightlight Productions, and costs P75 per month for Premium subscribers that can access up to 28 channels and access to premium movies and series.

Red Fiber
Red Fiber is the broadband internet service of Cignal TV. It offers ultra high-speed internet with a download speed of up to 400 Mbit/s bundled with Cignal channels and Cignal Play to selected residential areas in Metro Manila using the fiber-optic cable service of Meralco's Radius Telecoms. It is commercially launched on November 16, 2020.

Cignal Entertainment
Cignal Entertainment is Cignal TV's film and television production unit. It was launched in 2017 with the mini-drama Tukhang, followed by several series and movies they produced such as Ang Babaeng Allergic sa WiFi (2018, for Pista ng Pelikulang Pilipino, co-produced with The IdeaFirst Company and October Train Films), Born Beautiful (2019, co-produced with The IdeaFirst Company and October Train Films), Malecdito (2019, co-produced with Fox Networks Group Philippines), Feelenial (2019, co-produced with DSL Events and Production House, Inc.) and Cara x Jagger (2019, co-produced with APT Entertainment).

Since August 2020, Cignal Entertainment serves as the primary production and content provider unit of Cignal TV for TV5's blocktime airings. It handles entertainment and lifestyle programs co-produced with Archangel Media, Inc., Regal Entertainment and Viva Television, among others, mostly featuring artists from ABS-CBN and few artists from GMA Network.

List of current television productions

Formerly aired programs

List of featured films produced and/or distributed by Cignal Entertainment

Former assets

Weather Information Network

Weather Information Network is the first weather-oriented television channel in the Philippines. It is created in May 2012 as Cignal TV forms a partnership with New Zealand-based Metra Weather. the channel brings projected storm tracks, wind direction, rain volume, water conditions, regional and provincial weather, and seven-day forecasts as well as other information related to weather. The channel ceased airing on December 23, 2013, as TV5 transfers its broadcast facilities from its TV5 Studio Complex in Novaliches, Quezon City to TV5 Media Center in Reliance, Mandaluyong.

Bloomberg TV Philippines

Bloomberg TV Philippines was a Philippine business news channel formed through a partnership of Cignal TV, TV5 Network and Bloomberg L.P. Launched on October 5, 2015, it includes a variety of locally produced business and complementary programs powered by News5 and foreign news from the main Bloomberg Television. The channel was shut down on May 27, 2018 and it was replaced by One News. Although, Bloomberg-produced programs is still carried by One News under the block of the same name of the now defunct channel.

Hyper

Hyper was a sports and entertainment cable/satellite television channel and one of the first two channels launched by Cignal TV. Launched on April 14, 2012, its programming composed of local and foreign produced sports programs and events, some of them came from now-defunct primetime block AKTV, as well as Jai-Alai and horse racing events. The channel was shut down on January 9, 2019 and it was replaced by One Sports.

One Screen

One Screen was an entertainment cable/satellite television channel. It was launched on June 15, 2020. It aired movies from local productions and foreign content from CinemaWorld, as well as reruns from TV5 and third-party productions. The channel ceased its broadcast on January 1, 2022.

Colours

Colours was a magazine cable/satellite television channel. Launched on May 5, 2012, its programming composed primarily of lifestyle and reality shows. The channel ceased its broadcast on January 1, 2022.

Mediascape TV stations

Since 2010, Cignal TV/Mediascape's regional television stations are the primary affiliate group of TV5 and One Sports.

Active

Inactive/Former analog

References

External links
Official website

 
MediaQuest Holdings
Mass media companies established in 1983
Mass media companies of the Philippines
Companies based in Mandaluyong
Philippine companies established in 1983